Two Stage Sisters is a 1964 Chinese drama film produced by Shanghai Tianma Film Studio and directed by Xie Jin, starring Xie Fang and Cao Yindi. Made just before the Cultural Revolution, it tells the story of two female Yue opera practitioners from the same troupe who end up taking very different paths in their lives: "one succumbs to bourgeois affluence and privilege, while the other finds inspiration and fulfilment in the social commitment associated with the May Fourth movement and the thought of Lu Xun.” The film documents their journey through abusive feudal conditions in the countryside before achieving success and prestige on the stage, meanwhile historically following Shanghai's experience under Japanese and KMT rule. This original screenplay depicts the socio-political changes encompassing China from 1935-1950 (just after the founding of New China) through the theatrical world of Shaoxing, and accordingly mixes both a Chinese aesthetic with Hollywood and socialist realist forms. The main protagonist (Zhu Chunhua) is said to be based on the life of Xie Jin's friend and opera-veteran Yuan Xuefen.

Plot
In 1935 a runaway tongyangxi, Zhu Chunhua, takes refuge at an itinerant Yue Opera troupe (Yangchun Theatre Troupe) performing at a Shaoxing village. The head of the troupe, A’Xin, intends to send the girl away, but Yue Opera teacher Xing, seeing her potential, takes Chunhua in as a disciple and trains her. Chunhua signs a deal with the troupe and becomes the performing partner (in a dan role) to the teacher’s daughter Yuehong, the latter performing as a xiaosheng.

A rich provincial landlord Ni invites Chunhua and Yuehong to sing at his house privately after the troupe reaches his province. He takes an interest in Yuehong; however, Yuehong and her father spurn his interest and as a result, Kuomintang cops forcibly seize Yuehong one day during a performance. Chunhua is also arrested and tied to a pillar for days as “public humiliation”. The two are released after Xing and A’Xin send bribes to the KMT cops.

During the Second Sino-Japanese War, Yuehong, Chunhua and the troupe go through hard times.  In 1941, Teacher Xing dies of an illness, and troupe master A’Xin sells his two best performers to Tang, a Shanghai opera theater manager, on a three-year contract. Yuehong and Chunhua, now sworn sisters, rapidly become Tang’s biggest stars, causing Tang to forsake his aging star and former lover, Shang Shuihua.

Three years elapse. Yuehong and Chunhua are renowned in the city. Chunhua remains down-to-earth but Yuehong grows steadily more materialistic. Sick of having to sing opera for life, Yuehong rashly agrees to Tang's proposal, but Chunhua distrusts Tang and refuses to support Yuehong’s marriage plans.  Unbeknownst to Yuehong, Tang already has a wife, and is keeping her as a mistress.

One day faded ex-star Shang commits suicide by hanging herself back. Chunhua is incensed that Tang, her former lover, attempts to shirk his responsibilities by claiming he has nothing to do with her death. Through this episode, Chunhua gets to know a "radical" lady journalist Jiang Bo (a female communist reporter investigating the death), who advises her to become "progressive" to teach other Chinese to distinguish between truth and falsehood. She starts performing “progressive” operas like an adaptation of Lu Xun’s ‘’The New Year Sacrifice’’ in an attempt to politicize the work of the troupe, whose production consequently gets banned.

Chunhua’s works alert the KMT regime who gives Tang the task to ruin Chunhua's reputation. They get A’Xin to file a lawsuit against Chunhua and Manager Tang coerces Yuehong to testify against Chunhua, but at the crucial moment in the courtroom, Yuehong faints.

The film ends in 1950, one year after the establishment of the People’s Republic of China. Chunhua prepares to perform The White-Haired Girl for country folks at Zhejiang. Tang has run off to Taiwan with the KMT cohort and Yuehong is quietly abandoned at Shaoxing province. Although Yuehong witnesses Chunhua’s drama, she is too ashamed to face her sworn sister again. Near a quay later the day, however, the sisters manage a tearful reunion. On the boat the following day, Yuehong vows to learn her lesson and walk the "correct" path while Chunhua dedicates her entire life to performing revolutionary operas.

Cast

Xie Fang as Zhu Chunhua (竺春花), the main protagonist, a Yue Opera performer. Originally a tongyangxi, she is adopted and later excelled in the dan role. She becomes a leftist and performs revolutionary operas.
Cao Yindi as Xing Yuehong (邢月红), daughter of Teacher Xing. She plays the xiaosheng (male) parts. Enticed by Manager Tang to forsake her art, but is abused frequently until reunited with sworn sister, Chunhua.
Feng Qi as Teacher Xing (邢师傅), father of Yuehong, a Yue Opera teacher.
Gao Aisheng as Jiang Bo (江波), a "progressive" leftist lady reporter
Shen Fengjuan as Xiaoxiang (小香), a former troupe performer who plays supporting roles. Later reunited with Chunhua.
Xu Caigen as Jinshui (金水), Xiaoxiang's husband and former troupe member.
Shangguan Yunzhu as Shang Shuihua (商水花), an aging former star in the Shanghai opera scene, a former mistress of Manager Tang who was jilted. She later hangs herself.
Ma Ji as Qian Dakui (钱大奎), a Yue performer at the Shanghai theater
Luo Jingyi as Yu Guiqing (俞桂卿), a Yue performer at the Shanghai theater
Wu Bofang as Little Chunhua (小春花), a village tongyangxi who is Chunhua's namesake.
Li Wei as Manager Tang (唐经理), the unscrupulous manager and theater owner who keeps Shang and Yuehong as his mistresses.
Deng Nan as A'xin the “Monk” (和尚阿鑫), the former troupe owner, a not-so-educated boor who will do anything for money.
Shen Hao as Mrs Shen (沈家姆妈), a wealthy heiress who tries to adopt Chunhua and has illicit dealings with Manager Tang.
Dong Lin as Third Master Ni (倪三老爷), a provincial landlord who tries to take Yuehong for sexual favors.
Ding Ran as Commissioner Pan (潘委员), a Kuomintang official intent on ruining Chunhua and her revolutionary opera troupe.

Background and cultural contexts

Cultural Revolution and censorship 
Xia Yan, Vice Minister of Culture when the film was made, had made script corrections and encouraged Xie Jin to shoot the film. Xia Yan was particularly disliked by Mao's wife, Jiang Qing, and thus Two Stage Sisters is argued to have stood out for censure due to its association with Yan.

By the second part of the film, Xie is referring to when the protagonists encounter communist ideals, which of course reflected to the audience the communist regime at hand. In Xie's depiction, the communist state becomes the inheritor of the leftist realist tradition, but Xie Jin knew the reality was otherwise. In other words, "drama and film could no longer remain truly realist under the communist regime." Accordingly, instead of having the two stage sisters reunite in the "new society" which would allow them to perform Opera with full devotion and creative freedom as Xie Jin wanted, he was forced to work within the restraints of the censorships of the time and instead have Chunhua encourage Yuehong to become a revolutionary and to perform revolutionary-focussed plays.

Chinese Opera 
Two Stage Sisters demonstrates director Xie’s keen interest in traditional Chinese opera art, which he had studied during the Japanese Occupation at the Jiangen Drama Academy. He had then worked with well-known opera practitioners such as Huang Zuoling and Zhang Junxiang.

Regarding the stage sisters themselves, some forms of Chinese opera troupes during this time were made up of artists mostly in one gender only. This was due to the strict fengjian taboo which forbade men and women to appear together on stage as romantic leads. This norm is still the case in more traditional Chinese opera troupes performing in mainland China, Taiwan or Hong Kong. This phenomenon also explains why most huangmeidiao movies feature women in male roles (e.g. Ivy Ling Po).

Symbolism

Setting 
After World War II, Shanghai once again fell under the control of the Kuomintang. The turmoil within the theatrical world symbolizes the bitter political struggles between the Communists and the Nationalists. Some of the changes in the theatrical world reflect the momentous changes that were transforming China at this time.

James Wicks stated that "The film's use of setting is similar to pre-1949 Shanghai films: spatial geography becomes a powerful force in the construction of class identity, and the division between the rural and the urban takes on moral connotations." Shanghai was often seen during the early days of the PRC as a symbol of the bourgeois decadence and as such, is seen as the ideal venue to depict the stage sisters’ struggles later in life.

Yuan Xuefen (袁雪芬) 

Yuan Xuefen, a friend of director Xie Jin, and one of the world's most notorious Shaoxing Opera experts is argued to be the "real life prototype" of Zhu Chunhua's character in the film. She was notably also a consultant on the film. After the film was banned, Yuan simultaneously received immense scrutiny and was targeted during the Cultural Revolution for her participation in the film's production. This was likely because "some of her undertakings inadvertently coincided with the interests of the left, such as her staging of Sister Xianglin and her refusal to be involved with the Yue Opera Workers’ Union, which was sanctioned by the Nationalist Social Affairs Bureau.” However, she claims she did not act out of political motivation until after liberation.

The film's other two characters Xing Yuehong and Shang Shuihua are also said to be loosely based on Ma Zhanghua (Yuan's real life stage sister) and Xiao Dangui ("Queen of Yueju"), who in reality suffered at the hands of their theatre bosses. "All these actresses, including Yuan’s famous “ten sisters” of yueju in 1940s Shanghai alluded to in the film, were Shengxian orphans, child brides, or poverty-stricken country urchins sold to country troupes to seek a living in the theater."

Socio-Political commentary

This backstage melodrama is about a Shaoxing opera rising from an itinerant small-town theater to Shanghai celebrity, a metaphor for the changes sweeping across China in the decades before the founding of People’s Republic of China. By creating a duality between the aesthetic of the film and that of the fictional theatre world, Xie Jin structured Two Stage Sisters to mimic a Chinese opera performance; "Its episodic narrative structure, for example, relies on often disjointed, autonomous sequences to give it a sweeping scope and an ability to deal with all aspects of society." The different historical, political, and social events depicted onstage in the theatre thus are intended to act as a microcosm for Chinese society as itself. The depiction of an "actress [bearing] hardship and [resisting] the corruption of a rotten society, [and] coming to understand that her performance on the small stage is related to changing the bigger stage, that of society itself," is deployed to convey national sentiments of the time of political consciousness.

Xie Jin uses Chunhua's suffering to represent his own opinions about the KMT's political reign at this time. Another example of using Chunhua to convey political commentary is at the end of the film when Chunhua's state drama troupe revisits the same town that used to be corrupt and a site where she was punished. The film is filled with commentary on the change from the old to the new society through the personal dramas of the stage sisters which parallel the theatrical plays they act in order to represent the political changes occurring in China at this time.

The opera star Shangguan Yunzhu excellently plays the character of Shang Shuihua who commits suicide in the film. Four years after the film's production, due to the obscure circumstances stemming from the Cultural Revolution, actress Shangguan Yunzhu tragically died by suicide as well. This incident inadvertently ties Xie Jin's film deeper into exposing the hardships of the Cultural Revolution, as Shangguan's death was caused largely by the harsh persecution she faced for being deemed a counter-revolutionary.

Reception and criticism
Two Stage Sisters was well received domestically when it was first screened, but the film was heavily attacked during the Cultural Revolution for portraying and condoning “bourgeois” values. Since the late 1970s however, both the director and the film have been rehabilitated and the movie has made its round internationally. Two Stage Sisters won the Sutherland Trophy of British Film Institute Awards in the 24th (1980) London Film Festival, amongst other international prizes.

Critical Reviews 
Today, Two Stage Sisters is considered by some to be Xie Jin’s masterpiece.

Steve Jenkins on behalf of Monthly Film Bulletin commends Xie Jin's genre-defying work: 
"...while Two Stage Sisters successfully embraces many of the staple elements of Western melodrama (central female characters, the corrupting influence of the city as opposed to the country, the courtroom climax), it also demands, through its rejection of transcendence, a redefinition of genre."
"Stage Sisters remains a remarkable historical document to this day because it encapsulates a compelling effort to satisfy the contradictory requirements of state propaganda, classical Hollywood narrative continuity, and Soviet socialist realism."

He also voices public opinion over the film's controversial portrayal of historic events:

"Many articles in The People's Daily'' condemned the film because of its sympathetic portrayals of the bourgeoisie and its incongruence with Mao's expectations for art. Specifically, Xie Jin was accused of employing the critical realist tradition of the 1930s rather than using the state-approved style of "revolutionary realism and revolutionary romanticism."" as congruent with Dong's (1966) argument."

4K Restoration in 2014
In 2014, the film underwent a six-month 4K restoration at L'Immagine Ritrovata Film Restoration Laboratory in Bologna, Italy. The restored film opened the 2014 Shanghai International Film Festival at the city's Daguangming Grand Theatre, with the lead actresses in attendance.

Notes

External links

 
 
 Two Stage Sisters at the Chinese Movie Database

1964 films
Chinese drama films
1960s Mandarin-language films
Films directed by Xie Jin
Films set in Shanghai
Films about actors
Films set in 1935
Films set in 1950
Films about Chinese opera
Yue opera